Country Charley Pride is the first album by country music artist Charley Pride. It was released in 1966 on the RCA Victor label (catalog no. LSP-3645). The album was awarded three stars from the web site AllMusic. The album debuted on Billboard magazine's country album chart on November 5, 1966, peaked at No. 16, and remained on the chart for 23 weeks.

Track listing
Side A
 "Busted" [2:07]
 "Distant Drums" [2:44]
 "Detroit City" [3:01]
 "Yonder Comes A Sucker" [2:22]
 "Green, Green Grass Of Home" [2:55]
 "That's The Chance I'll Have To Take" [2:03

Side B
 "Before I Met You" [2:26]
 "Folsom Prison Blues" [2:35]
 "The Snakes Crawl At Night" [2:46]
 "Miller's Cave" [3:15]
 "The Atlantic Coastal Line" [2:12]
 "Got Leavin' On Her Mind" [2:14]

See also
 Charley Pride discography

References

1967 albums
Charley Pride albums
Albums produced by Chet Atkins
Albums produced by Jack Clement
Albums produced by Bob Ferguson (music)
RCA Records albums